Iceland is a volcanic island country in the northern Atlantic Ocean.

Iceland may also refer to:

Places
 Iceland, California, a former settlement
 Iceland Lake, a lake in Ontario, Canada

People 

 Reuben Iceland (1884–1955), American poet

Other uses
 Iceland (film), a 1942 musical
 Iceland (supermarket), a British supermarket chain focused mainly on frozen food

See also
 Island (disambiguation)
 Islandia (disambiguation)